Bantik is an endangered Austronesian language, perhaps a Philippine language, of North Sulawesi, Indonesia. It is the traditional language of the Bantik people, who are now switching to Manado Malay (the local variety of Malay) as their language for everyday communication, though Bantik is still used as a marker of ethnic identity.

Bantik is regarded as a men's language, used by men in private, and it is considered improper to speak to women in Bantik. Very few women under the age of 30 know how to speak it.

Phonology

Vowels

Consonants

Grammar

Morphology
Bantik is agglutinative.

Syntax
The basic sentence orders of Bantik are subject–verb–object and verb–object–subject. The former is used when introducing a new object, the latter when introducing a new subject.

References

Further reading

External links
 Bantik Wordlist at the Austronesian Basic Vocabulary Database

Agglutinative languages
Endangered Austronesian languages
Languages of Sulawesi
Sangiric languages